Ox Tales, also known as , is an anime television series produced by Telecable Benelux B.V. in association with Saban Entertainment and animated by Telescreen Japan. It was a co-production between Japan and the Netherlands based on a Dutch comic strip Boes created by Wil Raymakers and Thijs Wilms. The series ran on the Japanese network TV Tokyo from 7 April 1987–29 March 1988. It consists of 102 fifteen-minute episodes, that were regularly broadcast as 51 half-hour shows of two episodes each. The series currently has two English dubs. The 1989 dub produced by Saban and the 2010 dub produced by m4e, the current owner of the Telescreen library. Ox Tales is still remained to appear as a column strip in several Dutch daily and weekly newspapers.

Plot
The series follows the adventures of Ollie the Ox as he runs the Funny Farm, containing possibly every animal known, with his best friend Jack, a turtle while told by a cynical toucan.

Characters

Main characters
 Ollie (Boes in the 2010 dub), an ox - Ollie/Boes is the owner of the Funny Farm and isn't exactly the greenest grass on the farm. Although he means well, For some reasons, he makes situations worse than they normally are, but this is actually rare.
 Jack Turtleson (Tad in the 2010 dub), a turtle - Jack/Tad is probably Ollie's best friend, as he's seen mostly hanging out with him in each episode. However, in every mess that he and Ollie/Boes get into, you can bet that his shell will break apart at least once. In the Dutch comics and anime version, along with the Italian version, he is a female turtle.
 Sammy (Saffie in the 2010 dub), a dog - Ollie's/Boes' most loyal pet on the farm who accompanies Ollie/Boes and Jack/Tad on their adventures in some episodes.

Others
 Edward the Elephant - When an air hose or a water hose is needed, Edward comes through.
 Ellen the Elephant
 Igor the Octopus - Igor is closely inflatable.
 Crown the Eagle
 Gaylord the Gorilla - A chief primate who usually doesn't know his own strength at times.
 Bongo the Gorilla
 Audrey the Ostrich - She is usually has her head stuck in the ground somewhere on the farm.
 Rodney the Rhino - A hot-headed rhino who cannot seem to keep his horn on or even in for one part.
 Holly the Kangaroo
 Bob the Kangaroo
 Weave the Kangaroo
 Jenny the Kangaroo
 Teddie the Kangaroo
 Larry the Cheetah
 Lenny the Lion - Probably past his prime, as evidenced by his balding mane, Lenny imagines himself as a great hunter, although he cannot seem to take the initiative when he finally catches his food.
 Towilla the Toucan - A sarcastic toucan who is the narrator of the English, German and Japanese dubs of the show and normally would insult a character and comment on what happens in the episode and will interrupted by the events in the episode. He breaks the fourth wall for some reason.
 Bruce the Bear - A greedy bear who often tries to steal Ollie's honey.
 Buggy the Stork
 Horace the Horse - A hot-headed and stubborn horse that tends to have a knack for fighting.
 Moe the Mole - Pops up from time to time as a segue between scenes, usually laughing at a comedic situation with a laugh similar to Woody Woodpecker's, although he knows when to keep his laughter under control, especially with situations involving crocodiles. In some episodes, his laughter is interrupted by something related to the situation he's laughing at.
 Harry the Sloth
 Hannah the Chicken - Leader of a gang chickens that never take kindly to having their eggs stolen by predators.
 Mr. Croack Frog
 Bibbo the Owl
 Jojo the Baboon
 Samson the Seal
 Shirley the Sheep
 Walter the Woodpecker
 Willy the Woodpecker
 Helda the Hippo
 Robby the Rooster
 Paul the Polar Bear
 Down Hill Donny the Stork
 Nessie the Cow
 Calvin the Calf - A young cow who always has the need to suck on an udder.
 Topsy the Aardvark
 Tom the Turkey
 Tim the Orangutan
 Patrick the Porcupine
 The MacDuffs the storks
 Snuffles the Panda
 Zane the Zebra - A zebra who has about as much stubbornness as Horace.
 Peggy the Pig - Actually she'll be found feeding her piglets.
 Peter the Pig
 Jolly the Dolphin
 Tiger the Cat
 Cecil the Skunk- A mischievous skunk with both an abundant flatulence issue and a rather sadistic habit of only wanting to relieve his massive amounts of gas, if he can do so in the presence of others.
 Bura the Crow
 Rott the Parrot
 Cal the Crocodile - A crocodile with a big appetite, and will try to eat any animal on the farm, but fails to do so in any way.
 Morris the Mouse - A strategic mouse who knows how to get away in a hurry, and ruin mouse-catching plans of others in the process.
 Calvin the Cat - He's the resident mouse hunter on the farm, although Morris mostly gets the better of him.

Theme songs

Japanese version
Kimi no freedom (君のフリーダム）
 Performed by Raffle (OP)
Joke DE mou dash (ジョークDE猛ダッシュ)
 Performed by Koorogi '73 (OP)

Credits

Original credits 
 Directors: Hiroshi Sasagawa, Maki Nakahara (co-director)
 From an original idea by: Wil Raymakers, Thijs Wilms, Maki Nakahara
 Music: Shinsuke Kazato (Original version), Clous van Mechelen (Dutch version)
 Special effects and sound design: Hisao Shirai
 Series Composition: Matsue Jinbo, Tony Dirne, Rob Dirne, Mario de Vries
 Writers: Nao Furukawa, Toshi Ohira, Kiyoshi Onishi, Kaoru Jushina
 Executive producer: Dennis Livson
 Prosucer: Kazuo Tabata

Saban English version credits 
 Executive producer: Haim Saban
 Supervising producer: Winston Richard
 Directors: Robert V. Barron, Tom Wyner
 Executive in charge of production: Jerald E. Bergh
 Associate producer: Eric S. Rollman
 Script supervisor: Tony Oliver
 Music by: Haim Saban & Shuki Levy
 Original idea and character designs: Wil Raymakers, Thijs Wilms
 Re-recording mixers: Clive Mizumoto, Gary Coppola, R.D. Floyd
 Music administration: Ron Kenan
 Music supervisor: Andrew Dimitroff
 Music orchestrations and arrangements by: Barry Trop, Richard Firth
 Music engineers: Barron Abramovitch, Xavier Garcia
 Music editors: Nick Carr Paul Ray, Patrick Von Wiegandt, Mark Ryan Martin
 Sound effects editors: Gary Jaye, John Valentino, Scott Page
 Additional direction: Scott Page, Jeff Winkless
 Script and talent coordinator: Kelly Griffin
 Engineers: Scott Page, Bruce Peters, David Walsh
 Assistant engineers: Ron Salaises, Kevin Newson, Bill Filipiak
 Film transfers by: Action Video
 On-line editor: Susan Jenkins
 Title art by: Sam Johnson
 Post production assistant: Amber Santilli
 Assistant to Mr. Saban: Sherry Jeffreys
 Accounting executive: Carol Diesel
 Production accountants: Vicky Werby, Val Decrowl, Janice Auchterloine, Sharon Staine
 Copyright 1987/88 Meander Studio/Telecable Benelux/T.V. Tokyo
 Copyright 1989 Saban Productions, Saban International Services, Inc., Saban International N.V.

Saban English dubbed episode writers 
 Tracy Alexander
 Robert Axelrod ("If The Clog Fits...")
 Robert V. Barron
 Robert Benedict
 Robert Deutsch
 Melora Harte
 Dave Mallow
 Benjamin Lesko
 Richard Epcar
 Tony Oliver
 Steve Kramer
 Doug Stone
 Michael McConnohie
 Mike Reynolds
 Barbara Riel
 Donald Roche
 Michael Sorich
 Jeff Winkless
 Tom Wyner
 Shannon Mahan
 Eric Elfman
 Lisa Paulette
 Dayna Barron
 Wendee Manhel
 Johnny Goff
 Heather Upjohn
 Tim Reid
 Michael Santiago
 Jon Page
 Byrd Ehlmann
 Ann Burgund
 Nora L. Goodman
 Joe Ellison
 Edie Mirman
 Ardwight Chamberlain
 Barbara Oliver
 Mark Ryan-Martin
 Eric Early

Saban English dubbed voice actors 
 Jeff Winkless - Olly the Ox, additional characters
 Michael Sorich - Jack Turtleson, additional characters
 Steve Kramer - Towilla the Toucan, additional characters
Barbara Goodson - Moe the Mole, additional characters

Hoek & Sonépouse English version credits 
 Dubbing English version: Hoek & Sonépouse
 With the voices of: Michael Diederich, Amber Ruffin, Rob Andrist-Plourde and Brian Tijon Ajong
 Director English version: Michael Diederich
 Translation English version: Michael Diederich 
 Worldwide distribution: Telescreen B.V
 © 2010 Re-mastered and revised version: Meander Studio, Telecable Benelux, TV Tokyo

Broadcast and home media
The series has been aired in several countries outside Japan and has been dubbed and subtitled in English and numerous other languages. The series was broadcast in the United Kingdom several times between 1991 and 1996, on the ITV network.

In the late 1990s, the series was planned to air on Fox Family in the USA. However this was scrapped for unknown reasons.

In the USA, a few episodes of the show were released on VHS by Just for Kids in the early 1990s; the show was officially released on DVD in Portugal and Spain in 2006.

In 1989 Arab World, It first aired on Saudi TV. 
In the 2010s, the entire series is now uploaded by YouTube's m4e channel.

References

External links
 
 

1987 anime television series debuts
1988 Japanese television series endings
Japanese children's animated comedy television series
Comedy anime and manga
Television shows based on comic strips
Anime based on comics
TV Tokyo original programming
ITV children's television shows
Television series about cattle
Animated television series about turtles
Animated television series about dogs
Television series by Saban Entertainment